The Battle of Guadarrama (also known as Batalla de Somosierra) was the first battle in the Spanish Civil War involving troops loyal to the Second Spanish Republic in the Guadarrama Range. The battle took place in the last week of July and in early August 1936. The Nationalist side sent by General Mola was attempting to cross the mountain passes of the Sierra de Guadarrama and reach Madrid by the North, but the Republican side, made up of militiamen and troops disbanded by the government left Madrid to stop the Nationalists. The Republican side was successful and the Nationalist troops did not manage to cross the mountain passes.

Background 
General Emilio Mola, the director of the military coup that sought to end the Popular Front government used a coordinated uprising of compromised garrisons to implement a state of war in the demarcations, starting with the army from Africa. Mola realised that it would be difficult for the coup to succeed by itself in Madrid under the command of General Fanjul, so it  was planned that Mola would lead a column from the North to support the uprising in Madrid. Should this fail, General Franco would go from the Moroccan Protectorate across the Strait of Gibraltar and advance on Madrid from the South and West.

Operations 
On 19 July, after Mola seized control of Navarra after proclaiming a state of war, he sent Colonel Colonel García Escámez to the south at the head of a column to support the coup in Guadalajara. When the column was around 30 kilometres from its objective it learned that the coup in Guadalajara had already failed and was in the hands of Government forces from Madrid.

Colonel García Escámez decided instead to go to the pass of Somosierra, the easternmost pass from the North Plateau to Madrid that crosses the Sierra de Guadarrama. He met a group of royalists from Madrid including Joaquín Satrústegui and Carlos Miralles who were defending the railway tunnel against the government forces that had taken Guadalajara. On Wednesday July 22, Escámez's column managed to secure control of the pass, vital for the advance towards Madrid.

At midnight on Tuesday, July 21, another rebel column made up of two or three hundred men, commanded by Colonel Serrador left Valladolid "amid scenes of indescribable enthusiasm." General Sanjurjo continued with the mission of occupying the other important pass in the Sierra de Madrid, Alto del León, located to the west of Somosierra. When they arrived at the pass they found that it had already been occupied by a group of militiamen from Madrid, but they managed to evict them from there and on July 25 it was already in their possession.

Neither the columns of Escámez or Serrador advanced towards Madrid due to lack of ammunition and they took shelter preparing to resist the attack of the republican forces. Their situation became desperate in the following days, until finally the ammunition that General Franco had sent from Andalusia arrived.

A government column under the command of Colonel Mangada left Madrid in the direction of Ávila to try to isolate the rebel forces occupying Alto del León from the rear. In his advance Mangada conquered several towns in which the civil guard had joined the coup but did not go beyond Navalperal de Pinares, fearful of losing communication with Madrid and being isolated. The propaganda of the rebels attributed that decision to the "intervention" of Santa Teresa de Ávila who had deceived Mangada by telling him that Ávila was "full of armed men". Commander of the civil guard Lisardo Doval, well known for having led the brutal repression that followed the defeat of the Revolution of Asturias, tried but failed to stop Mangada's advance. Doval's failure gave Mangada a great reputation that earned him a promotion to the rank of general despite the fact that he had not fulfilled his mission of taking Avila.

The columns of militiamen and volunteer soldiers who tried to evict the rebel troops from the pass of Somosierra were commanded by the brothers Francisco Galán, lieutenant of the Civil Guard, and José María Galán, lieutenant of the Carabineros, joined by prominent leaders of the Madrid CNT such as Cipriano Mera and Teodoro Mora. Captain González Gil organized the so-called "October" Battalion with workers from the aeronautical industry, among others. The idea of putting loyal professional officers in command of the militia columns, or at least advising their bosses, came from General José Riquelme, who was in command of the troops in Madrid and the 1st Organic Division.

Of the militia units that fought in the Sierra de Guadarrama the most famous was the Fifth Regiment, organized by the Communist Party of Spain. Their starting point had been the communist militia (MAOC) and the "La Pasionaria" battalion formed in the first days of the coup in Madrid. This unit was organized following the model of the Red Army and had political commissars who had to explain to the soldiers the reasons for the fight and ratify the orders of the military leaders. The man to inspire the unit was the Italian communist and Comintern agent Vittorio Vidali (“Carlos Contreras”) and its first boss was the young communist Enrique Castro Delgado. Another communist who also stood out in the fighting in the mountains, although outside the Fifth Regiment, was Valentín González "El Campesino".

The Republic had the advantage in the battle of Guadarrama with both artillery and air superiority, in addition to the easy logistics provided by the close proximity to Madrid. In August there were already some 40,000 militiamen framed in columns of about 300 men each in Madrid, who adopted distinctive revolutionary names such as the "Paris Commune" or "October 1st". The Republic could not count on regular military units with their commands and their equipment however, because the republican government of José Giral had decreed the dissolution of these units to stop the uprising. In addition, the conflicts between the militia chiefs and the professional military were constant, especially with the anarchist confederal militias.

Consequences 
The fighting was fierce and led to prisoners being shot on both sides.

It is very difficult to estimate the number of victims because the number of fighters who left for the front was unknown, although less than 5,000 were killed. On the Republican side many officers were killed, including Captains Condés, Fontán Cadarso and González Gil — Condes was, along with the deceased Luis Cuenca, one of the men related to the murder of José Calvo Sotelo. Colonel Castillo, who was in command of the republican forces in Alto del León was apparently killed by his own men (or possibly committed suicide when he learned that his son had fallen in combat). On the rebel side, the death of the Falangist leader Onésimo Redondo was notable, killed in a meeting in Labajos by some militiamen who had penetrated beyond the front lines.

At the end of May 1937 the Republicans launched the Segovia offensive, however the attempt was unsuccessful and in less than a week the offensive had failed. Throughout the rest of the war the front remained static until the final offensive of the rebels at the end of March 1939, ending the war for the with a victory for the Rebels.

See also
List of Spanish Nationalist military equipment of the Spanish Civil War
List of Spanish Republican military equipment of the Spanish Civil War
Fifth Regiment

References

External links
Cerro Pelado y Paredes de Buitrago

Guadarrama
1936 in Spain
Guadarrama
July 1936 events
Guadarrama
Guadarrama
History of the province of Segovia